Clydebank Museum in Clydebank, West Dunbartonshire, Scotland was opened in  in the Clydebank Town Hall, and is operated by West Dunbartonshire Council. The themes of its collection are related to the area's local history, which includes shipbuilding at John Brown & Company and the work of the Scottish Colourists. The museum's collection of Singer sewing machines, dating from 1850 to the early 1980s has been recognised by Museums Galleries Scotland as being of national significance. The Garden Gallery exhibits works by contemporary Scottish artists, which are available for sale.

References 
Notes

Citations

External links 
 Clydebank Museum, West Dunbartonshire Council.

Museums in West Dunbartonshire
Local museums in Scotland
Maritime museums in Scotland
Industry museums in Scotland
Clydebank